Natural wine refers to a generalized movement among winemakers for production of wine using simple or traditional methods.  Although there is no uniform definition of natural wine, it is usually produced without the use of pesticides or herbicides and with few or no additives. Typically, natural wine is produced on a small scale using traditional rather than industrial techniques and fermented with native yeast.  In its purest form, natural wine is simply unadulterated fermented grape juice with no additives in the winemaking process.  Other terms for the product include low-intervention wine, raw wine, and naked wine.

History
Some sources claim that the movement started with winemakers in the Beaujolais region of France in the 1960s. Several winemakers, namely Marcel Lapierre, Jean Foillard, Charly Thevenet, and Guy Breton, sought a return to the way their grandparents made wine, before the incursion of pesticides and synthetic chemicals that had become so prevalent in agriculture after the end of World War II. They became affectionately known as The Gang of Four. They were heavily influenced by the teachings and thoughts of Jules Chauvet and Jacques Neauport, two oenologists who studied ways to make wines with fewer additives. For quite some time the town of Villié-Morgon became a place for like minded winemakers to congregate and become influenced by the Gang of Four. Gradually this movement spread to other regions of France, and since has spread across the world, gradually gaining in popularity and attracting newer younger winemakers in more and more regions of the world.

Historically, natural wine has been connected to the German Lebensreform movement, where it gained popularity in the late 19th and early 20th centuries.

In the end of 19th century prominent Georgian poet and politician, Ilia Chavchavadze penned a series of articles responding to contemporary critics of “backward” natural winemaking practices, later collected and published under the title “Georgian Winemaking.” 
Some of famous quotes from the letters of Chavchavadze are: ..."The true purpose of winemaking, its beginning and end, is to make wine naturally, following the process by which nature itself transforms grape juice into wine"..."The primary virtue of every kind of food or drink must be to benefit the body, and not to harm it. Can transforming grape juice through artificial adulterants really be so attractive as to justify dispensing with our way of winemaking, which is focused on purity, on ensuring that the juice is not damaged by any additives, and on preserving the wine’s own natural character?"

References

Bibliography
 
 
 Fukuoka, Masanobu. The One Straw Revolution
 
 
 
 
 
 
 

Wine terminology